The "Europe Now!" Movement (Montenegrin and Serbian: Pokret "Evropa sad!" / Покрет "Европа сад!"; PES!), commonly known as simply Europe Now! (Evropa sad! / Европа сад!; abbr. ES!) is a centre-right, anti-corruption and pro-European political movement in Montenegro, founded in June 2022 by former Ministers of Finance and Economy, Milojko Spajić and Jakov Milatović. It describes itself as an economically focused movement, and is economically liberal.

History
The movement was founded on 26 June 2022 by Milojko Spajić and Jakov Milatović, the former independent Finance and Economy Ministers respectively, within the short-lived technocratic cabinet formed after the 2020 parliamentary election regime change. Previously, announcing joint political engagement and the formation of a new political movement back in February 2022, shortly after the technocratic cabinet of Zdravko Krivokapić lost the confidence by the new parliamentary majority. In addition to Spajic and Milatovic, prominent founding members of the movement include former defense minister, Olivera Injac and university professor Filip Ivanović. The name of the movement is identical with the economic reforms program that included popular set of measures, which increased minimal wage from €222 to €450 by cutting healthcare contributions, launched in January 2022 by the ministers during their tenure. The newly-founded party also announced future cooperation with other centrist and civic-oriented political subjects, such as the Democrats-led and the URA-led coalitions, as well with the minority interests parties, opposing the activity and positions of the DPS, DF and SNP, accusing them of corruption and fueling ethnic divisions, calling them "parties and policies of the past".

The movement debuted at the municipal elections in October 2022, seeing good results, especially in the elections in the capital city of Podgorica, which resulted in the fall from power of the populist DPS of President Milo Đukanović, which had ruled the city since the 1990s, with Europe Now! list balott carrier Jakov Milatović, leading new coalition majority in the Capital City Assemby. However, the formal announcement of the results is pending since the October 2022 election, until March 2023, caused by the vacancy within the Constitutional Court (due to the parliamentary crisis in the country), after the minor, both Montenegrin and Serbian nationalist organizations, such as "21st of May Initiative" and the Serb List, which many accuse of acting as a spoiler party of the DPS, submitted complaints to inactive court about "irregularities during local election campaign", leaving the outgoing convocation as well DPS-led administration elected in May 2018 staying in power in acting term during 2023. Movement also obtain the mayoral post in Danilovgrad and Žabljak, becoming part of the new ruling coalitions in seven out of 11 municipalities in which they participated in the elections. All political opinion polls published in the aftermath of the local elections, as of March 2023 showed an increase in the popular support of the movement.

In January 2023, movement co-founder Milojko Spajić announced his candidacy for the March 2023 presidential elections, Eventually, he was disqualified due to suspicions he has Serbian citizenship, since Montenegrin law does not allow people with dual citizenship to run for the presidency. Spajić’s disqualification by the central election body, composed mostly by the DPS and DF delegates, was quick and did not wait for the completion of a probe launched by the Ministry of Interior. This gave food to speculation that decision was influenced by the DPS as Spajić was seen as a serious threat to incumbent president Milo Đukanović. Commision members representing the DF also voted to disqualify Spajić. Shortly after that, movement decided to nominate its other co-founder Jakov Milatović.

Electoral performance

Presidential elections

References

2022 establishments in Montenegro
Political parties established in 2022
Political parties in Montenegro
Pro-European political parties in Montenegro